Following the 2017 election, Christina Krzyrosiak Hansen from the Social Democrats had become mayor, after an agreement between the Green Left, Danish People's Party and the Red–Green Alliance.

In 2017, DR published an article naming Holbæk Municipality as the country's poorest municipality In 2020, TV2 Øst could reveal that things were improving in the municipality. The year before, Zetland had also made an article explaining that Holbæk had improved a lot since the new mayor.

These things would appear to have gained support for the continuation of Christina Krzyrosiak Hansen as mayor. The results would see the Social Democrats going from 9 seats, to 19 seats, 4 more than needed for an absolute majority. Christina Krzyrosiak Hansen would become the candidate to receive the 2nd highest number of personal votes in the 2017 Danish local elections, despite Holbæk only having 19th largest population of the 98 Danish municipalities. This would make an easy pathway for her to continue as mayor.

Electoral system
For elections to Danish municipalities, a number varying from 9 to 31 are chosen to be elected to the municipal council. The seats are then allocated using the D'Hondt method and a closed list proportional representation.
Roskilde Municipality had 31 seats in 2021

Unlike in Danish General Elections, in elections to municipal councils, electoral alliances are allowed.

Electoral alliances  

Electoral Alliance 1

Electoral Alliance 2

Electoral Alliance 3

Electoral Alliance 4

Results

Notes

References 

Holbæk